Um Sang-hyun (Hangul: 엄상현; Hanja: 嚴祥鉉; born December 29, 1971) is a South Korean voice actor who began his career by joining Educational Broadcasting System's voice acting division in 1998.

Before making his debut as a voice actor, he used to work in theaters, including performing his roles as a Japanese assassinator and a royal servant in a 1997 South Korean musical The Last Empress and working as the assistant director for South Korean musicals Gaeddongi and Moskito the same year. In 1992, he also appeared in a South Korean independent film called Opening the Closed School Gates.

After his exclusive work at EBS, Um has been a freelancer since 2001. In the early 2000s, he came to prominence after voicing Kira Yamato on the Korean dub of Mobile Suit Gundam SEED. Since then, Um has dubbed a number of television animation series such as Chrono Crusade, Digimon Frontier, Fullmetal Alchemist, InuYasha and School Rumble. As a result of his popularity among children audiences, the voice actor won a Nickelodeon Korea Kids' Choice Award in 2012 for Favorite Voice from an Animated Movie (known as Best Voice Actor/Actress in South Korea). He became the recipient of the award for his role as Po in Kung Fu Panda: Legends of Awesomeness, gaining 3,121 votes, which is about 38% of the entire poll.

Although having been highly active as a freelancer for more than a decade, Um is also still one of the main voice actors representing EBS. He is best known for his roles as Calcifer on the Korean dub of the Studio Ghibli animated movie Howl's Moving Castle, L Lawliet on the Korean dub of the Japanese television animation series Death Note, Po on the Korean dub of the DreamWorks Animation film series Kung Fu Panda and even more recently, Poli on the South Korean animated children's television series Robocar Poli.

Career

Voice acting

TV animation dubbing
A
 Arthur (내 친구 아서, EBS)
 Mr. Ratburn
 Astro Boy (우주소년 아톰, SBS)
 Shibugaki (Hwang-bo on the Korean TV edition)
 Avatar: The Last Airbender (아바타: 아앙의 전설, EBS/Tooniverse)
 Sokka

B
 Ben 10: Alien Force (벤 10: 에일리언 포스, Cartoon Network Korea)
 Kevin Levin
 Ben 10: Omniverse (벤 10: 옴니버스, Cartoon Network Korea)
 Kevin Levin
 Ben 10: Ultimate Alien (벤 10: 얼티메이트 에일리언, Cartoon Network Korea)
 Kevin Levin
 Beyblade: Metal Fusion (메탈 베이블레이드, Tooniverse)
 Hyoma Click the link "> 박성태님, 엄상현님의 메탈블레이드" and then watch the third video posted. (Dong-san-do-ryeong on the Korean TV edition)
 Big Windup! (크게 휘두르며, Animax)
 Yuuichirou Tajima
 Blood+ (블러드 플러스, Animax)
 Akihiro Okamura
 Karl Fei-Ong/The Phantom
 Kai Miyagusuku
 Nathan Mahler

C
 Catch! Teenieping (캐치! 티니핑, KBS)
 Ajaping
 Kyle
 Chip and Potato (칩과 포테이토, Netflix)
 Little Poppa
 Chloe's Closet (클로이의 요술옷장, EBS)
 Lovely Carrot (Mr. Yellow on the Korean TV edition)
 Chobits (쵸비츠, Champ TV)
 Hiromu Shinbo
 Chrono Crusade (크로노 크루세이드, Tooniverse)
 Chrono
 Chuggington (칙칙폭폭 처깅턴, EBS)
 Dunbar
 Emery (Alf on the Korean TV edition)
 Speedy McAllister
 Cosmic Quantum Ray (파워퀀텀맨, KBS)
 Quantum Ray (Quantum Man on the Korean TV edition)
 Cross Game (크로스 게임, EBS)
 Ko Kitamura (Bak Tae-yeong on the Korean TV edition)
 Curious George (호기심 많은 조지, EBS)
 Bill

D
 Death Note (데스 노트, Champ TV)
 L. Lawliet (L) See "L (류자키) (엄상현 분)".
 Detective Conan (명탐정 코난, Tooniverse)
 Yuuichi Sakuraba (Seo Jeong-hoon) on the episode "The Bay of Revenge"
 Digimon Frontier (디지몬 프론티어, AniOne TV/Tooniverse)
 Cerberumon
 Koji Minamoto Watch the first video posted. In this video, Koji appears after around five minutes and thirteen seconds. (Seon-woo Hyeon on the Korean TV edition)
 Superstarmon
 Yutaka Himi (Jin Bo-ram on the Korean TV edition)
 Dora the Explorer (도라도라 영어나라, EBS/Nickelodeon Korea)
 Backpack (on the EBS edition)
 Santa on the episode "Dora's Christmas Carol Adventure" (on the EBS/Nickelodeon Korea edition)
 Swiper the Fox (on the EBS edition)
 Dr. Slump (닥터 슬럼프 Original, JEI TV)
 Taro Soramame (Seo Tae-soo on the Korean TV edition)
 Dragon (내 친구 드래곤, EBS)
 Alligator
 Dude, That's My Ghost! (유령, 빌리!, Disney Channel Korea)
 Billy Joe Cobra

F
 The Fairly OddParents (별난 깜찍 수호천사/티미의 못 말리는 수호천사, EBS/Nickelodeon Korea)
 Anti-Cosmo (on the Nickelodeon Korea edition)
 Chip Skylark III (on the EBS/Nickelodeon Korea edition)
 Cosmo Watch the posted videos. (on the Nickelodeon Korea edition)
 Denzel Quincy Crocker (on the EBS edition)
 Franklin and Friends (꼬마 거북 프랭클린, EBS)
 Fox (Andy on the Korean TV edition)
 Mr. Heron
 Mr. Turtle
 Frog and Friends (개구리와 친구들, EBS)
 Rat
 Full Metal Panic? Fumoffu (풀 메탈 패닉 후못후, Tooniverse)
 Masatami Hyuga
 Fullmetal Alchemist (강철의 연금술사, Champ TV)
 Envy
 Jean Havoc
 Solf J. Kimblee
 Tim Marcoh

G
 Garfield (심술고양이 가필드, JEI TV)
 Garfield
 Geronimo Stilton (제로니모의 모험, EBS)
 Benjamin Stilton
 Go! Anpanman (날아라 호빵맨, Animax)
 Shokupanman (Breadman on the Korean TV edition)

H
 Hunter × Hunter (헌터x헌터, AniOne TV)
 Milluki Zoldyck

I
 I'm Gonna Be an Angel! (천사가 될 거야, AniOne TV)
 Yuusuke Kamoshita (Yoo Min on the Korean TV edition)
 InuYasha (이누야샤, Champ TV)
 Koga See "코우가 (엄상현 분)". See "코우가 (엄상현 분)". (except on InuYasha: The Final Act episodes)

K
 Kung Fu Dino Posse (쿵푸 공룡 수호대, KBS)
 Kane
 Kung Fu Panda: Legends of Awesomeness (쿵푸 팬더: 전설의 마스터, Nickelodeon Korea)
 Po

L
 Lego Ninjago: Masters of Spinjitzu (닌자고, Champ TV/JEI TV/Nickelodeon Korea)
 Fangtom (The right-headed one)
 Jay the Blue/Lightning Ninja
 Nuckal
 Little Battlers eXperience (골판지 전사, Cartoon Network Korea)
 Daiki Sendo (Shin Dae-soo on the Korean TV edition)
 Love in Love (러브 in 러브, AniOne TV)
 Keitaro Urashima Watch the video at the bottom of the post.

M
 Marsupilami (우바우바 마수필라미, EBS)
 Marsupilami
 The Melancholy of Haruhi Suzumiya (스즈미야 하루히의 우울, Animax)
 Kyon
 MetaJets (메타제트, KBS)
 Zachary Kim
 Mobile Suit Gundam SEED (기동전사 건담 SEED, Champ TV)
 Kira Yamato In this video, "The OS Reconstruction" scene appears after around eight minutes and fifteen seconds.
 My Bride Is a Mermaid (세토의 신부, Tooniverse)
 Nagasumi Michishio
N
 Naruto(나루토, 투니버스) Naruto Uzumaki(Adult)
 Ninja Hattori-kun (꾸러기 닌자 토리, Disney Channel Korea/JEI TV)
 Shishimaru (Mong-mong on the Korean TV edition) See "몽몽 (엄상현 분)". See "몽몽 (엄상현 분)".

O
 Oh My Goddess! (오! 나의 여신님, Animax)
 Keiichi Morisato Watch the posted videos.
 One Piece (원피스, Tooniverse)
 Wanze
 Ouran High School Host Club (오란고교 사교클럽, Tooniverse)
 Hikaru Hitachiin In this video, Hikaru appears after around one minute and twenty seconds.

P
 The Penguins of Madagascar (마다가스카의 펭귄들, Nickelodeon Korea)
 Mort Watch the posted videos.
 Phi Brain: Puzzle of God (파이 브레인: 신의 퍼즐, JEI TV)
 Doubt
 Rook Banjō Crossfield
 Planet of the Beast King (수왕성, Animax)
 The adult Thor
 Please! Psammea-don (모래요정 바람돌이, EBS)
 Cyril (Yeong-soo on the Korean TV edition)
 Play Ball (플레이볼, Animax)
 Takao Taniguchi (Han In-seong on the Korean TV edition)
 The Prince of Tennis: Another Story (테니스의 왕자: Another Story, Animax)
 Bunta Marui
 Genichiro Sanada
 Katsuo Mizuno
 Rin Hirakoba
 Yushi Oshitari
 Wakashi Hiyoshi

R
 Regular Show (레귤러 쇼, Cartoon Network Korea)
 Muscle Man
 Pops Maellard
 Robocar Poli (로보카 폴리, EBS)
 Grandpa Musty
 Poli
 Terry
 The Rose of Versailles (베르사유의 장미, EBS)
 André Grandier
 Rurouni Kenshin: Reflection (바람의 검심 성상편, AniOne TV)
 Yahiko Myojin
 Rurouni Kenshin: Trust & Betrayal (바람의 검심 추억편, AniOne TV)
 Himura Kenshin

S
 School Rumble (스쿨럼블, Champ TV)
 Kyousuke Imadori
 Shaman King (샤먼킹, AniOne TV)
 Horohoro In this video, Horohoro appears after around three minutes and five seconds.
 Shōnen Onmyōji (소년 음양사, Animax)
 Abe no Narachika
 Fujiwara no Toshitsugu
 Suzaku
 Taijō
 Sonic X (소닉X, JEI TV)
 Sonic the Hedgehog
 SpongeBob SquarePants (네모네모 스펀지송, EBS)
 Barnacle Boy
 DoodleBob (DoodleSong on the Korean TV edition)
 Sunako, You're Needed (엽기인걸 스나코, Anibox TV)
 Ranmaru Morii In this video, Ranmaru appears after around four minutes and twenty-five seconds.

T
 Tayo the Little Bus (꼬마버스 타요, EBS/Cartoon Network Korea)
 Pat
 Rogi
 Shine
 Teenage Mutant Ninja Turtles (돌연변이 특공대 닌자 거북이, Nickelodeon Korea)
 Michelangelo
 The Simpsons(심슨 가족, EBS)
 duffman
 Krusty the Clown (S10~S12)
 Michael Jackson S3E1
 snake jailbird
 cecil terwilliger
 Thomas & Friends (꼬마 기관차 토마스와 친구들, EBS)
 Edward the Blue Engine
 Gordon the Big Engine
 James the Red Engine
 Percy the Small Engine
 Toby the Tram Engine
 Tickety Toc (시계마을 티키톡!, EBS/Tooniverse)
 Hopparoo (Ddo-ing-ki on the Korean TV edition)
 Time Travel Tondekeman (시간 탐험대, EBS)
 Hayato Shindou (Ricky on the Korean TV edition)
 Tokyo Mew Mew (베리베리 뮤우뮤우, SBS)
 Blue Knight
 Deep Blue
 Masaya Aoyama (Hwang Min-woo on the Korean TV edition)
 Pie
 Transformers: Prime (트랜스포머 프라임, EBS)
 Alpha Trion
 Breakdown
 Cliffjumper
 Colonel Leland "Silas" Bishop
 Hardshell
 Jack Darby
 One of the Vehicons on the episode "Orion Pax, Part 1"
 Tsubasa: Reservoir Chronicle (츠바사 크로니클, Tooniverse)
 Syaoran

V
 VeggieTales (야채극장 베지테일, EBS)
 Bob the Tomato

W
 Watership Down (워터십 다운의 토끼들, EBS)
 Campion
 Hawkbit
 We Were There (우리들이 있었다, Animax)
 Motoharu Yano
 Whistle! (내일은 축구왕, Animax)
 Kō Kazamatsuri (Kang Min on the Korean TV edition)
 Santa Yamaguchi (Song Seong-soo on the Korean TV edition)
 Teppei Koiwa (Go Cheol-gi on the Korean TV edition)
 The Wild Thornberrys (엘리의 야생탐험, EBS)
 Darwin

X
 xxxHolic (xxx홀릭, Anibox TV)
 Kimihiro Watanuki

Y
 YooHoo & Friends (유후와 친구들, KBS)
 Pookee
 Roodee
 Yu-Gi-Oh! Duel Monsters (유희왕 듀얼몬스터즈, Champ TV)
 Yugi Mutou (Yoo-hee on the Korean TV edition)

Animated movie dubbing

2000s

2010s

Film dubbing
A
 Anne of Green Gables (빨간 머리 앤, EBS)
 Jonathan Crombie as Gilbert Blythe
 The Avengers (어벤저스, Korean IPTV Edition)
 Tom Hiddleston as Loki

B
 Batman Begins (배트맨 비긴즈, SBS)
 Larry Holden as Carl Finch
 Ben 10: Alien Swarm (벤 10: 에일리언 스웜, Cartoon Network Korea)
 Nathan Keyes as Kevin Levin

C
 Charlie's Angels: Full Throttle (미녀 삼총사 2: 맥시멈 스피드, SBS)
 Shia LaBeouf as Max Petroni
 Crimson Tide (크림슨 타이드, SBS)
 Danny Nucci as Petty Officer Danny Rivetti

D
 Deep Impact (딥 임팩트, SBS)
 Jon Favreau as Dr. Gus Partenza

E
 Eloise at Christmastime (엘로이즈의 크리스마스 대소동, EBS)
 Rick Roberts as Brooks
 Eternal Sunshine of the Spotless Mind (이터널 선샤인, SBS)
 Elijah Wood as Patrick Wertz

F
 Face/Off (페이스 오프, SBS)
 Alessandro Nivola as Pollux Troy

H
 Harry Potter and the Chamber of Secrets (해리 포터와 비밀의 방, Korean-dubbed edition in theaters)
 Sean Biggerstaff as Oliver Wood
 Harry Potter and the Order of the Phoenix (해리 포터와 불사조 기사단, Korean-dubbed edition in theaters)
 Rupert Grint as Ron Weasley
 Harry Potter and the Philosopher's Stone (해리 포터와 마법사의 돌, Korean-dubbed edition in theaters)
 Sean Biggerstaff as Oliver Wood

I
 The Imaginarium of Doctor Parnassus (파르나서스 박사의 상상극장, KBS)
 Verne Troyer as Percy

L
 Little Nicky (리틀 니키, SBS)
 Allen Covert as Todd
 The Lord of the Rings: The Return of the King (반지의 제왕 3: 왕의 귀환, SBS)
 Billy Boyd as Pippin
 Lost in Translation (사랑도 통역이 되나요?, SBS)
 Giovanni Ribisi as John
O
 Ocean's Twelve (오션스 트웰브, SBS)
 Vincent Cassel as Baron François Toulour/The Night Fox
 Once Upon a Time in Mexico (원스 어폰 어 타임 인 멕시코, SBS)
 Mickey Rourke as Billy Chambers

P
 The Patriot (패트리어트, SBS)
 Gregory Smith as Thomas Martin
 Jay Arlen Jones as Occam
 Pearl Harbor (진주만, SBS)
 William Lee Scott as First Lieutenant Billy Thompson
 Pinocchio (피노키오, Korean-dubbed edition in theaters)
 Leonardo
 The Polar Express (폴라 익스프레스, SBS)
 Eddie Deezen as the Know-It-All Kid
 Tom Hanks as Santa Claus
 Power Rangers Dino Soul vs. Lupin Force vs. Patrol Force (파워레인저 다이노소울 vs. 루팡포스 vs. 패트롤포스)
 Koh/Soul Red
 Power Rangers Engine Force vs. Wild Spirits (파워레인저 엔진포스 vs. 와일드스피릿, Korean-dubbed edition in theaters)
 Birca
 Hant Jō/Engine Green
 Power Rangers Magic Force the Movie: The Bride of Infershia (파워레인저 매직포스 극장판: 인페르시아의 신부, Korean-dubbed edition in theaters)
 Smoky the Magical Cat

R
 Racing Stripes (레이싱 스트라이프스, SBS)
 Frankie Muniz as Stripes
 Right on Track (꿈의 질주, EBS)
 Derek Boone as Todd

S
 Scooby-Doo 2 (스쿠비 두 2, SBS)
 Seth Green as Patrick Wisely
 Searching for David's Heart (데이비드를 찾아서, EBS)
 Ricky Ullman as Sam
 Spy Kids 3-D: Game Over (스파이 키드 3D, Korean-dubbed edition in theaters)
 Alan Cumming as Fegan Floop
 Robert Vito as Rez

T
 The Three Investigators and the Secret of Skeleton Island (소년 탐정단: 해골 섬의 비밀을 찾아서, EBS)
 Nick Price as Pete Crenshaw
 Top Gun (탑 건, SBS)
 John Stockwell as LT Bill "Cougar" Cortell
 Whip Hubley as LT Rick "Hollywood" Neven
 Transformers: Revenge of the Fallen (트랜스포머 2: 패자의 역습, KBS)
 Rainn Wilson as Professor R. A. Colan
 Tom Kenny as Wheelie

W
 War of the Worlds (우주 전쟁, SBS)
 Justin Chatwin as Robbie Ferrier
 The Whole Ten Yards (나인 야드 2, SBS)
 Matthew Perry as Dr. Nicholas "Oz" Ozeransky

Foreign TV show dubbing
B
 Blue's Clues (블루스 클루스, Nickelodeon Korea)
 Steven Burns as Steve (former host of the show)

C
 Cosby (못 말리는 코스비, EBS)
 Doug E. Doug as Griffin Vesey

D
 Dinotopia (다이노토피아, EBS)
 Tyron Leitso as Karl Scott
 DC Titans(타이탄즈, Netflix)
 Don hall(Elliot Knight)

E
 Everwood (사랑의 마을 에버우드, EBS)
 Chris Pratt as Bright Abbott

H
 H2O: Just Add Water (H2O, Nickelodeon Korea)
 Burgess Abernethy as Zane Bennett
 Heroes (히어로즈, SBS)
 James Kyson Lee as Ando Masahashi
 House (닥터 하우스, SBS)
 Scott Foley as Hank Wiggen on the episode "Sports Medicine"

L
 The Legend of Bruce Lee (이소룡 전기, SBS)
 Lin Yumiao as Ah Lin

M
 Masked Rider Decade (가면라이더 디케이드, Champ TV)
 Tetsuya Makita as Arata (Kamen Rider Gatack)
 Masked Rider Kabuto (가면라이더 가부토, Champ TV)
 Yuuki Sato as Arata Kagami (Kamen Rider Gatack)
 Masked Rider W (가면라이더 더블, Champ TV)
 Renn Kiriyama as Shotaro Hidari (Bak Tae-sang on the Korean TV edition)
 Masked Rider Zi-O (가면라이더 지오, Champ TV)
 Yuuki Sato as Arata Kagami (Kamen Rider Gatack / Kamen Rider Kabuto II)
N
 Numb3rs (넘버스, SBS)
 Colin Hanks as Dr. Marshall Penfield on the episode "Convergence"

P
 Power Rangers Dino Soul (파워레인저 다이노소울, Champ TV)
 Hayate Ichinose as Koh/Soul Red
 Power Rangers Engine Force (파워레인저 엔진포스, Champ TV)
 Masahiro Usui as Hant Jō/Engine Green
 Power Rangers Magic Force (파워레인저 매직포스, JEI TV)
 Smoky the Magical Cat
 Tetsuya
 Titan
 Prison Break (프리즌 브레이크, SBS)
 Lane Garrison as Tweener

T
 Tales from the Neverending Story (네버엔딩 스토리, EBS)
 Robert Crooks as Tartus
 Taylor's DNA (테일러는 열두 살, EBS)
 Nicolas Dunn as Hector Garcia
 Tomica Hero: Rescue Force (출동! 레스큐 포스, JEI TV)
 Kyosuke Jinrai/R2
 Tweenies (트위니스, EBS)
 Milo

W
 Worst Best Friends (로저의 단짝친구들, EBS)
 Andrew S. Gilbert as Mr. Thesaurus

Narrations
 The Best Cooking Secrets (최고의 요리비결, EBS)
 Culture & Art 36.5 (문화예술 36.5, EBS)
 D'Factory (디팩토리, Elle atTV)
 Friday Night Theater (금요극장, EBS)
 FUN FUN Board Games (FUN FUN 보드게임, Brain TV)
 Janghak Quiz (EBS 장학퀴즈, EBS)
 Star Track (스타트랙, O'live TV)
 TV Scoop! Surprising World (TV 특종! 놀라운 세상, MBC)
 tvN eNEWS (tvN 이뉴스, tvN)
 The UCC Scientific Expedition (UCC 과학탐험대, SBS)
 The World of My Friends (내 친구들의 세상, MBC)

Commercial film dubbing
A
 Ahngook Pharmaceutical (안국약품)
 The pollack on the commercial "Tobicom-S"
 Aurora World (오로라월드)
 Poli on the commercial "Robocar Poli Action Toy (로보카 폴리 작동인형)"
 Poli on the commercial "Robocar Poli Rag Doll (로보카 폴리 봉제인형)"

B
 Binggrae (빙그레)
 The commander (voice only) on the commercial "Binggrae Samanco: The Revenge of Samanco (붕어싸만코: 싸만코의 역습)"

C
 CJ E&M (씨제이 E&M)
 Po on the trailer for Superstar K3

F
 FedEx (페덱스)
 The black guy on the commercial "Zombie Outbreak"

G
 GS Caltex (GS칼텍스)
 Shinbbori on the commercial "The Good-Hearted Oil Stories (착한 기름 이야기)"

H
 HP Pavilion (HP 파빌리온)
 Shaun White on the commercial "The Computer Is Personal Again"

I
 IBK (IBK 기업은행)
 Oscar on the commercial "IBK Salary Account (IBK 급여통장)"

K
 Kellogg's Frosted Flakes (켈로그 콘푸로스트)
 Tony the Tiger (since 2008)
 KOBACO (한국방송공사 공익광고협의회) The thief appears after around eleven seconds.
L
 The Lego Group (레고 그룹)
 Narration for the "Lego Ninjago" commercials
 LG Electronics (LG전자)
 Narration for the commercial "XCanvas David"
 LG Telecom (LG텔레콤)
 The squid alien on the commercial "Mikey Meets an Alien (우주인을 만난 마이키)"

M
 Meritz (메리츠화재)
 Tata (The blue-haired Meritz Merry Doll) on the "Meritz Merry Dolls (메리츠 걱정인형)" commercials

S
 Shinhan Card (신한카드)
 Two guys on the early part of the commercial "Shinhan LOVE Card"
 SKY (스카이)
 Narration for the commercial "SKY Hush"
 Sonokong (손오공)
 Narration for the commercial "Fruity Robo (후로티 로봇)"

T
 Tous Les Jours (뚜레쥬르)
 Poli on the commercial "Tous Les Jours Robocar Poli Cake"

Z
 Zambus Korea (잼버스 코리아)
 Narration for the commercial "Chuggington Die-Cast Toys"

Video game dubbing
0-9
 007: Quantum of Solace (007: 퀀텀 오브 솔러스)
 Mitchell

A
 Apex Legends (에이팩스 레전드)
crypto

B
 Blade & Soul (블레이드 앤 소울)
 Go-bong
 In-doo-ra

C
 City of Mist (회색도시)
 Kwon Hyeon-seok
 Shin Ho-jin
 Cookie Run: Kingdom (쿠키런: 킹덤)
 Licorice Cookie
 Call of Duty: Vanguard (콜 오브 듀티: 뱅가드)
 lucas riggs

D
 Diablo III (디아블로 3)
 Male Wizard
 Dota 2 (도타 2)
 Viper

G
 Grand Chase (그랜드체이스)
 Ercnard Sieghart
Grand Chase for kakao
Ercnard Sieghart

H
 Halo 3: ODST (헤일로 3: ODST)
 Buck

K
 Key of Heaven (천지의 문)
 Eigen
 Kingdom Under Fire: Circle of Doom (킹덤 언더 파이어: 서클 오브 둠)
 Curian
 Kingdom Under Fire II (킹덤 언더 파이어 2)
 Glen

L
 League of Legends (리그 오브 레전드)
 Garen (The Might of Demacia)
 Rammus (The Armordillo)
 The Lord of the Rings Online: Shadows of Angmar (반지의 제왕 온라인: 어둠의 제국 앙그마르)
 Legolas
 Lost Odyssey (로스트 오딧세이)
 Tolten
Love and Producer (러브앤프로듀서)
Baek Gi 
M
 Magna Carta: Crimson Stigmata (마그나카르타: 진홍의 성흔)
 Ases
 MapleStory (메이플스토리)[G A M E] '메이플 스토리' 추가 성우진(7/19 추가), See "엄상현-칼라일" (Carlisle).
 Dual Blade
 Mechanic
 Cadena (Male)
 Mr. Hazard
 Carlisle
 Havoc

S
 Star Project Online (스타 프로젝트 온라인)
 Sebastian Leon von Valencia
 Steambot Chronicles (스팀봇 크로니클)
 Vanilla R. Beans

T
 Tales of Destiny 2 (테일즈 오브 데스티니 2)
 Kyle Dunamis
 Tekken 3D: Prime Edition (철권 3D 프라임 에디션)
 Hwoarang, Baek Doo San
 Tekken 5 (철권 5)
 Hwoarang, Baek Doo San
 Tekken 5: Dark Resurrection (철권 5: 다크 레저럭션)
 Hwoarang, Baek Doo San
 Tekken 6 (철권 6)
 Hwoarang, Baek Doo San
 Tekken 6: Bloodline Rebellion (철권 6: 블러드라인 리벨리온)
 Hwoarang, Baek Doo San
 Tekken Revolution (철권 레볼루션)
 Hwoarang
 Tekken Tag Tournament 2 (철권 태그 토너먼트 2)
 Hwoarang, Baek Doo San
 Tekken Tag Tournament 2 Unlimited (철권 태그 토너먼트 2 언리미티드)
 Hwoarang, Baek Doo San
 Tekken Tag Tournament 2: Wii U Edition (철권 태그 토너먼트 2 Wii u 에디션)
 Hwoarang, Baek Doo San
 Tekken 7 (철권 7)
 Hwoarang
Tekken 7: Fated Retribution
Hwoarang

W
 World of Warcraft (월드 오브 워크래프트)
 Anduin Llane Wrynn (after Cataclysm)

Drama CD
Sound of Prince (어이쿠! 왕자님 오디오 북 《사운드 오브 왕자님》)
 Roe

TV appearances

1990s

2000s
{| class="wikitable"  style="width:100%"
!  style="background:#b0c4de; width:5%;"| Year(s)
!  style="background:#b0c4de; width:25%;"| Title
!  style="background:#b0c4de; width:15%;"| Network
!  style="background:#b0c4de; width:10%;"| Role
!  style="background:#b0c4de; width:45%;"| Notes
|-
| 2003 || Into the Careers(성공 예감! 직업 속으로) ||rowspan="4"| EBS || Himself ||
|-
|rowspan="2"| 2005 || Anitopia(애니토피아) || Himself || He appeared on the segment "Ani-Where (애니웨어)". (Episode 89)
|-
| Career and People(일과 사람들) || Himself ||
|-
| 2005-06 || Tok! Tok! Boni, Hani(톡! 톡! 보니 하니) || Host || He hosted the segment "Tell Me, Show Me (말해 줘, 보여줘)" Thursdays.
|-
| 2006 || The Morning of the World(생방송 세상의 아침) || KBS || Himself ||
|-
| 2008 || EBS DocuPrime(EBS 다큐프라임) || EBS || Himself || Episode: "Children's Privacy: Male and Female (아이의 사생활: 남과 여)"
|}

2010s

Stage appearance

Stage directing

Film appearance

Awards

Nickelodeon Korea Kids' Choice Awards

Miscellaneous facts
 Although born in 1971, he looks younger than his actual age, and that is why many fans of Um tend to call him 상현소년 (Sang-hyun-so-nyeon) meaning "The Boy Named Sang-hyun", or its shortened form, 상현손 (Sang-hyun-son).
 Um Tae-jun, the son of Um, also has worked as a voice actor, participating in dubbing of various television shows for children, including Blue's Clues, Dora the Explorer, Team Umizoomi, and Tickety Toc. He recently voiced young Mike on the Korean dub of Pixar animated film Monsters University.
 Um also sang some theme songs of his works, such as the opening theme for Kung Fu Panda: Legends of Awesomeness,  and "Clumsy Love", the ending theme for the third season of Chobits.
 In the South Korean version of the 2012 KCAs, a new award called "Favorite Voice from an Animated Movie (Best Voice Actor/Actress)" was featured along with "Favorite TV Actor/Actress (Best Actor/Actress)". In the following year, however, the former was excluded from the show, and thus Um currently remains the first and only recipient ever to win that category.
 As of October 2013, the total number of tickets sold for animated films which Um has participated in dubbing is about 38 million.
 The ending title for the Korean dub of Transformers: Prime'' is based upon a video shot by Goo Ja-hyeong (South Korean voice actor), who dubbed Megatron on the show. The title aired only when the first season of the show ended. In this video, Um appears for a moment, with a scene in which Jack Darby is running.

See also
 Educational Broadcasting System

Notes

References

External links
 Um Sang-hyun's profile on EBS Voice 
 상현중독 (Sang-hyun Joong-dok): The official fan club of Um Sang-hyun 
 
 Um Sang-hyun's Blog on Naver 

1971 births
Living people
South Korean male video game actors
South Korean male voice actors
Chung-Ang University alumni
20th-century South Korean male actors
21st-century South Korean male actors